Annunciation Greek Orthodox Cathedral may refer to:

 Annunciation Greek Orthodox Cathedral (Atlanta)
 Annunciation Greek Orthodox Cathedral (Houston)
 Annunciation Greek Orthodox Cathedral of New England